Robert of Knaresborough (St. Robert, born Robert Flower, 24 September 1218) was a British hermit who lived in a cave by the River Nidd, Knaresborough, North Yorkshire. His feast day is on the 24th of September.

Life 

He was born Robert Flower (Floure or Fleur), the son of Touk Flower, mayor of York, in York in 1160.

Very early in his life he became a sub-deacon and a novice at the Cistercian Newminster Abbey, but he stayed there only a few months.

Seeking a life of solitude, he visited a knight-hermit who lived in a cave by the River Nidd at Knaresborough, hiding from Richard I. On the death of the king, the knight returned home to his family leaving Robert on his own. The cave had a small chapel dedicated to St. Giles built around it. He continued to live there for some years, until a wealthy widow, Juliana, offered him a cell at St. Hilda's Chapel in nearby Rudfarlington. There, he developed a reputation as a wise and holy man who cared for the poor. He stayed just a year before his hermitage was destroyed by bandits. Robert, dispossessed of his home, lived for a time under the church wall at Spofforth, and then he tried living with the monks at Hedley, near Tadcaster, but he found them far too easygoing for his style of life. By this time, the area had calmed down and he returned to Rudfarlington.

Robert was well known for his charity to the poor and destitute. His favorite form of charity was to redeem men from prison. For a time, Robert prospered, having four servants and keeping cattle, but he was soon in trouble again, this time with William de Stuteville, the constable of Knaresborough castle, who accused him of harbouring thieves and outlaws. Having his hermitage destroyed for the second time, this time by the forces of law and order under William de Stuteville, Robert returned to the cave at Knaresborough, where he stayed for the rest of his life.

As a hermit, Knaresborough lived on a diet of herbs, roots and water. Although living as a recluse, his piëty soon attracted followers and gifts from local benefactors, gifts that included land alongside the river. A number of stories of St. Robert exist both in Latin and early English verse. One concerns his complaining about the King's deer eating his crops. Sir William, making fun of the saint, invites Robert to catch the offending beasts. Robert manages not only to herd the deer into his barn as if they were a tame flock of sheep but also harnesses them to his plough and sets them to work.

Robert died on 24 September 1218. Before his death, St Robert established an order of Trinitarian Friars at Knaresborough Priory, but he warned them that, when his time came, the monks of Fountains Abbey would try to carry his body away to their own establishment. He urged his followers to resist them, which they did, and so St. Robert was buried in his chapel cut from the steep rocky crags by the river, where, it was said, a medicinal oil flowed from his tomb; pilgrims came from near and far to be healed by it.

St. Robert's Cave

Robert lived in various places in the vicinity of Knaresborough before taking up residence in a cave by the River Nidd (then known as St. Giles' Priory). It is said that King John visited him and Trinitarian friars also venerated him. Towards the end of his life, pilgrims flocked to see Robert to seek spiritual guidance and to be healed of physical ailments. His brother Walter, then Mayor of York, came and paid for some new buildings, including a chapel dedicated to the Holy Cross. The floorplan of this can still be seen alongside Robert's cave in Knaresborough.

St. Robert's Well

Michael Calvert's History of Knaresborough (1844) describes St Robert's Well as being near the York Road, about one mile from the town. Calvert also writes that prior to 1791 it had been an open well about two feet deep, but in 1791 bathing facilities were built at the well because of its value as a cold bath. An 1850s OS map marks a "Cold Bath" near the York Road, as described by Calvert, and this site was connected by a track to St Robert's cave and chapel  to the south-west.

The Monkswell business park was built on the site of St Robert's well or Cold Bath, where a well shaft preserves the site of the spring that fed it. Visitors drop coins (as well as litter) through the metal grid that covers the wellshaft.

Veneration
St. Robert's feast day is on 24 September although he was never officially canonised. Seven stained-glass panels of his life, originally from Dale Abbey, survive at St. Matthew's Church in Morley, Derbyshire.

Legacy
The cave, carved into a limestone cliff, can still be visited by the public. A small chapel and evidence of a small living area are all that remain.

In North Yorkshire, Churches are dedicated to St. Robert at Knaresborough, and at Pannal, Harrogate.

References

External links

Knaresborough Online 
Clay, Rotha, Mary. Hermits and Anchorites of England, p. 42, Methuen & Co., Ltd., London, 1914
The Chapel of Our Lady of the Crag, section on St Robert, http://chapelofourladyofthecrag.btck.co.uk/StRobert.

1160s births
1218 deaths
12th-century English people
13th-century Christian saints
13th-century English people
English hermits
English Roman Catholic saints
Medieval English saints
People from Knaresborough
Yorkshire saints
Trinitarians